The 1991 Formula 3000 International Championship was the seventh season of Formula 3000 in Europe. Christian Fittipaldi won the championship after ten rounds.

Technical changes

A major technical change for 1991 was the introduction by Avon of radial-ply tyres. Compared to the previous crossply tyres, these could be more consistently manufactured, and made the cars more consistent aerodynamically, but gave the drivers less control at high slip angles.

The short wheelbase of the Lola was blamed for its inability to perform on the new tyres, and the Forti Corse team switched to Reynards after three rounds. The Eddie Jordan Racing team attempted to lengthen its Lolas by adding a spacer in between the engine and gearbox, but eventually it too purchased a Reynard for Damon Hill.

The Ralt name, last seen in F3000 in 1988, returned after being split off from the March Group.

Season summary

Alessandro Zanardi won for the new Il Barone Rampante team at the first race at Vallelunga. Jean-Marc Gounon then took Ralt's last F3000 win at Pau. Christian Fittipaldi won at Jerez, and Zanardi won again at Mugello.

Gounon won on the road at Enna, but he was controversially adjudged to have jumped the start. The race win was given to Emanuele Naspetti, who was making his first start in a Reynard after his Forti team had switched from Lolas. Naspetti then won the following three races at Hockenheim, Brands Hatch and Spa-Francorchamps. His success was blamed in part on the exotic fuel blend provided by Agip, which would be banned the following year.

Fittipaldi's Pacific teammate Antonio Tamburini won on the Bugatti Circuit at Le Mans. In the finale at Nogaro, Fittipaldi beat title rival Zanardi for the race win and the championship.

Drivers and constructors

Calendar

Final points standings

Driver

For every race points were awarded: 9 points to the winner, 6 for runner-up, 4 for third place, 3 for fourth place, 2 for fifth place and 1 for sixth place. No additional points were awarded.

Complete Overview

R16=retired, but classified  R=retired NS=did not start NQ=did not qualify

References

International Formula 3000
International Formula 3000 seasons